Paul Guérin (8 March 1830 – 23 June 1908) was a French priest, professor of philosophy, writer and encyclopedist.
He was gifted as a compiler, and is best known for being the author of the series Les Petits Bollandistes: vie des saints, with fifteen volumes (1866–1869)  that were republished several times.

Biography 

Paul Guérin was born in Buzançais to parents with modest income.
He studied in Buzancais at the municipal superior school.
In 1842 he entered the minor seminary in Saint-Gaultier, then, around 1849, the major seminary of Bourges. 
At the end of his studies he returned to Saint-Gaultier as a fourth grade teacher. 
He was then appointed to the Saint-Dizier college, where he taught for 13 years. 
At the same time as his teaching, he wrote and translated foreign works: for example, in 1857, Paradise Lost by John Milton. 
In 1858–1859 he published, by subscription, 4 volumes of Giry's Vie des saints.

Dictionary of dictionaries 

Paul Guérin edited and issued, under his secular name, the six volumes of the Dictionnaire des dictionnaires. Lettres, sciences, arts, encyclopédie universelle (1884–1890), with a revised edition in 1892, to which an important Illustrated Supplement was added in 1895.

As its title indicated, this work aimed to bring together “the substance of all the dictionaries […] the summary of human knowledge".
The author announced that writing the articles had been entrusted "to special men, both scholars and popularizers".
In fact, Paul Guérin surrounded himself with brilliant specialists, such as Camille Saint-Saëns for music and Frédéric Godefroy for lexicography. 
The editor, Frédéric Loliée, a literary writer, wrote the introduction.
The scientific part of the work counterbalances in places the traditional view of religious and theological articles.
Instead of limiting itself, like its predecessors, to the forms in use in France, this dictionary opens up the description of the French language to the dialects of Belgium, French-speaking Switzerland and particularly Quebec.

Biographies of authors and important articles were accompanied by a bibliography.

In spite of these qualities, the new encyclopedia faced competition from La Grande Encyclopédie, launched in 1886 by Marcellin Berthelot, and above all the Grand dictionnaire universel du XIXe siècle published by Pierre Larousse. 
Unable to dominate the market, the company had to reduce its ambitions and each new volume of the encyclopedia became a little smaller than the previous one.

Later dictionaries and encyclopedias largely copied the Dictionaries of dictionaries, as Alain Rey reports; “when I read the twentieth century encyclopedia ... except for several elements ... these large pompous volumes reproduced the text of the Dictionary of dictionaries, created under Prothonotary Guérin, whose name had disappeared ... ”.

Driven into bankruptcy and then into breach of trust to finance his dictionary, Guérin was sentenced to prison and went into hiding at the end of his life in the Lot department.

Publications 

 Vol 1, 2, 3, 4, 5, 6 and supplement,

Notes

Sources

 
 

1830 births
1908 deaths
French Catholics
French lexicographers
French encyclopedists